Pierre Léonce  Détroyat (1829-1898) was a French naval officer, journalist, and author.

Biography
He was born at Bayonne (Basses-Pyrénées). He studied at the École Navale, took part in the Crimean War, and in the subsequent expedition to China, and accompanied Archduke Maximilian to Mexico as Under-Secretary of State for Naval Affairs and chief of the military cabinet. During the Franco-Prussian War, he was for a time in command of the camp at La Rochelle. From 1866 to 1869, he was a member of the staff of La Liberté, which he edited from 1869 to 1876. He subsequently founded Le Bon Sens, and L'Estafette, the latter a conservative and Bonapartist journal. In 1885-86 he edited the Constitutionnel.

Works
His works include the following titles:
 La cour de Rome et l'empereur Maximilien (Paris, 1867)
 Du recrutement, de l'organisation et de l'instruction de l'armée française (On recruiting, organization and instruction for the French army, 1871)
 Le sénat et le scrutin de liste (1881)
 Nos possessions françaises en Indo-Chine (Our French possessions in Indo-China, 1887)
 Les chemins de fer en Amérique (Railroads in America, 1886)

References

External links
 

1829 births
1898 deaths
19th-century French journalists
19th-century French writers
La Liberté (French newspaper) editors
French military personnel of the Franco-Prussian War
French military personnel of the Crimean War
École Navale alumni